The 1974 Sandown 250 was an endurance race for Group C Touring Cars. The event was held at the Sandown Park circuit in Victoria, Australia on 8 September 1974 over a race distance of 130 laps (251 miles,  404 km). The race, which was Round 2 of the 1974 Australian Manufacturers' Championship, is recognised as the ninth Sandown 500.

The race was won by Allan Moffat driving a Ford Falcon XB GT Hardtop.

Classes
Entries were divided into four classes:
Class A : Up to 1300 c.c.
Class B : 1301 to 2000 c.c.
Class C : 2001 to 3000 c.c.
Class D : 3001 c.c. and over

Race results

References

External links
Australian Competition Yearbook, 1975 Edition
Australian Motor Racing Annual, 1975
CAMS Manual of Motor Sport, 1974
The Australian Racing History of Ford © 1989
The Official Racing History of Holden © 1988

Motorsport at Sandown
Sandown 250
Pre-Bathurst 500